Suneson is a surname. Notable people with the surname include:

Carl Suneson (born 1967), Spanish golfer
Karl Suneson (born 1975), Swedish sailor

See also
Sunesson